Deltatheroides is an extinct genus of Deltatheridiidae from Cretaceous of Mongolia.

References

Prehistoric metatherians
Cretaceous mammals
Fossils of Mongolia
Fossil taxa described in 1926
Prehistoric mammal genera